Toomas Vint (born 5 March 1944 in Tallinn) is an Estonian painter and writer.

Awards 
 1986: Konrad Mägi Prize
 2012: Order of the White Star, III class.

Literary works
 Suitsupilvedes unistus (poetry collection, 1968)
 Perekondlikud mängud (short story, 1977)
 Kojamehe naine (novel, 1990)
 Minu abielu prostituudiga (novel, 2003)
 Üüriline (novel, 2009)

References

Living people
1944 births
20th-century Estonian painters
20th-century Estonian male artists
21st-century Estonian painters
Estonian male novelists
Estonian male short story writers
20th-century Estonian writers
21st-century Estonian writers
Recipients of the Order of the White Star, 3rd Class
University of Tartu alumni
Artists from Tallinn
Writers from Tallinn